Christoph(er) Paudiß (1630 in Lower Saxony – 1666 in Freising, Upper Bavaria) was a Bavarian Baroque painter and a student of Rembrandt van Rijn.

Life 
After working in Stuttgart (1656), Prague, Dresden (1659–60), Vienna and Salzburg, he stayed his last four years in Freising where he worked for Fürstbischof Albrecht Sigismund von Bayern. He was married twice.

Work
His paintings and frescoes show dark pictures of everyday life. The Freisinger Diözesanmuseum has the largest collection of his work (15), others are scattered around Europe.

List of paintings
(incomplete)
Porträt eines jungen Mannes mit Pelzmütze, ca. 1660, Hermitage Museum St. Petersburg since at least 1859
Porträt eines Mannes, private, um 1661 (Budapest)
Der alte Bauer mit dem Kälbchen und dem Metzger, 1662, Dombergmuseum Freising
Frierende Kinder
Der Marodeur
Self-portrait
Bildnis eines Heiducken in hoher Mütze, 59 x 51,5 cm, Gemäldegalerie Alte Meister Dresden, Kat. 1930, Nr. 1995
Küchenstillleben (55 cm x 69,5 cm)
Küchentisch mit Pfeife, Heringen und Bier
Der Bauer und das Kälbchen, 1662
Vertreibung aus dem Tempel
Heimkehr vom Markt
Marter des Hl. Thiemo, 1662, Kunsthistorisches Museum Vienna, Nr. GG 2284

Notes

Sources
Karl Bosl: Bosls Bayerische Biographie, Regensburg, Pustet, 1983, pp. 574–575

External links
„Christopher Paudiß (1630-1666). Der bayerische Rembrandt?“ − Ausstellung im Dombergmuseum Freising vom 30. März bis 8. Juli 2007 (German, retrieved 2007-04-30)

Baroque painters
1630 births
1666 deaths
German Baroque painters
Pupils of Rembrandt